General Sir Frederick William Edward Forestier-Walker,  (17 April 1844 – 30 August 1910) was a British senior military officer and Governor of Gibraltar.

Military career
Forestier-Walker was the eldest son of General Sir Edward Forestier-Walker (previously Walker), by his first wife, Lady Jane Ogilvy-Grant, daughter of the 6th Earl of Seafield. Educated at the Royal Military Academy Sandhurst, Forestier-Walker was commissioned into the Scots Guards as ensign and lieutenant, by purchase, on 5 September 1862, and was appointed a lieutenant and captain, by purchase, on 11 July 1865.

In 1873 he was appointed Military Secretary to the General Officer Commanding Cape Colony and 15 October 1878 was promoted colonel.
Forestier-Walker saw action in the Cape Frontier Wars, for which he was appointed a Companion of the Order of the Bath in November 1878, and in the Anglo-Zulu War. He was promoted to captain and lieutenant colonel of the Scots Guards 20 March 1880. In 1882 he was appointed Assistant Adjutant and Quartermaster-General for the Home District but shortly after returned to South Africa. From 1884 he served in Bechuanaland, and in January 1886, for services in that protectorate, he was appointed a Companion of the Order of St Michael and St George.

He was appointed a brigadier at Aldershot in 1889 and Commander of British Troops in Egypt in 1890, during which he was knighted and promoted to a Knight Commander of the Order of the Bath. Upon returning from Egypt in 1895, he was appointed General Officer Commanding Western District, serving until 1890.

In 1899 he again returned to Africa, becoming GOC Cape Colony and acting as lieutenant general in command of Lines of Communication, South Africa Field Force, 1899–1901. He was thus responsible for disembarkation of troops and military stores and sending them to the front. In a despatch dated 31 March 1900, the Commander-in-Chief in South Africa, Lord Roberts, wrote how Forestier-Walker carried out his duties "with credit to himself and with advantage to the public service". He was promoted to Knight Grand Cross of the Order of St Michael and St George (GCMG) in November 1900 for his services in South Africa.
Following the end of the war, Forestier-Walker was promoted to the rank of general on 6 July 1902.

He was Governor of Gibraltar from 1905 until shortly before his death in 1910, and also acted as General Officer Commanding Mediterranean in 1909.

In retirement, he became a Director of the Cold Storage Company.

He was a Knight of Grace of the Order of St John from 1901.

Family
In 1887 he married Mabel Louisa Ross and they had one son.

References

Sources

|-

|-

 

|-

1844 births
1910 deaths
British Army generals
Knights Grand Cross of the Order of St Michael and St George
Knights Commander of the Order of the Bath
Scots Guards officers
Military personnel from Hertfordshire
British Army personnel of the Anglo-Zulu War
People from Bushey
Governors of Gibraltar
British Army personnel of the Second Boer War